Seiichirō Yasui  was a Japanese politician and bureaucrat who held a variety of positions in Japanese government.

He served as appointed Governor of Niigata Prefecture from 1940 to 1941, then as appointed Governor of Tokyo from 1946 to 1947, then as elected Governor of Tokyo from 1947 to 1959. He also served as one of the members of the House of Representatives from 1960 to his death in 1962.

Early life and career 
After graduating from the Faculty of Law in Tokyo Imperial University, Yasui joined the Ministry of Home Affairs, where he served as superintendent for Ibaraki and Kanagawa police. He later was promoted to the police chief of Toyama and Hyogo Prefectures.

In 1931, Yasui became a secretary to the Governor-General of Korea, Kazushige Ugaki, and served in colonial management, including the head of the Monopoly Bureau. In 1936, he was the Governor of Keiki Province. Yasui returned to Japan and was appointed Governor of Niigata Prefecture from 1940 to 1941.

Governor of Tokyo 
Yasui was first appointed Governor of Tokyo, serving the position from 1946 to 1947. In 1947, he was elected Governor of Tokyo in the first direct elections.

Yasui also decreased food shortages in the capital.

In 1954, Yasui supported a bid for Tokyo to host the 1960 Summer Olympics. Tokyo lost the bid to Rome, but it would later host the 1964 Summer Olympics.

Yasui was re-elected in 1951 and 1955.

Later life and death 
In 1960, after retiring from his post as Governor, Yasui ran for election in the House of Representatives for Tokyo 1st District as a member of the Liberal Democratic Party in the 1960 Japanese general election, and was elected with 27.4% of the vote. He served alongside Keiko Asanuma, Eiichi Tanaka, and Hyō Hara.

On 9 January 1962, he was made an honorary citizen of Tokyo due to his contributions to the city. Yasui died 10 days later, on 19 January. He is buried at Tama Cemetery.

Personal life 
Yasui's older brother,  was also an accomplished politician. He was the former President of the House of Councilors (1977–1980) and Minister of Home Affairs (1960–1962).

References 

1891 births
1962 deaths
Governors of Tokyo
University of Tokyo alumni
Japanese government officials
Japanese colonial governors and administrators
Members of the House of Representatives (Japan)
People from Okayama Prefecture
Recipients of the Order of the Rising Sun
Japanese police officers
Governors of Niigata Prefecture